Olé ELO is a compilation album by the Electric Light Orchestra (ELO) covering their early years. Released in 1976, this LP was originally compiled by United Artists Records as a promotional album for American radio stations, but when copies of the LP started selling to fans "underground" United Artists decided to release it in the US to capitalize on the band's growing popularity.

Track listing
Original US United Artists pressings of the album contained the full-length versions of "Kuiama" and "Roll Over Beethoven", as included in the album Electric Light Orchestra II. Original promotional copies were pressed on gold vinyl. An extremely limited run of white, blue & red vinyl promotional pressings was also made. Later US releases and CBS/Jet reissues have included edited versions of these two songs. "Kuiama" was shortened to 9:08, and the single edit of "Roll Over Beethoven" was used, which was 4:31.

Side one

Side two

Charts and certifications

Charts

Certifications

References

1976 greatest hits albums
Albums produced by Jeff Lynne
Electric Light Orchestra compilation albums
Epic Records compilation albums
Promotional albums